Ludwigslust-Land is an Amt in the Ludwigslust-Parchim district, in Mecklenburg-Vorpommern, Germany. The seat of the Amt is in Ludwigslust, itself not part of the Amt.

The Amt Ludwigslust-Land consists of the following municipalities:
Alt Krenzlin
Bresegard bei Eldena
Göhlen
Groß Laasch
Lübesse
Lüblow
Rastow
Sülstorf
Uelitz
Warlow
Wöbbelin

Ämter in Mecklenburg-Western Pomerania